Francisco Javier Reyes Acosta (born 7 February 1990 in La Ceiba, Honduras) is a Honduran footballer who currently plays as a goalkeeper for Liga Nacional de Honduras club Club Deportivo Victoria.

International career
Reyes has represented his country at the 2007 FIFA U-17 World Cup, the 2009 FIFA U-20 World Cup and was a non-playing squad member at the 2012 Summer Olympics.

References

1990 births
Living people
People from La Ceiba
Association football goalkeepers
Honduran footballers
Olympic footballers of Honduras
Footballers at the 2012 Summer Olympics
C.D. Olimpia players
C.D. Real Sociedad players
2009 CONCACAF U-20 Championship players